Antalaha is an urban municipality in northern Madagascar. It belongs to the district of Antalaha, which is a part of Sava Region. The population of Antalaha was 67.888 in 2018.

Farming provides employment for 40% of the working population.  The most important crop is vanilla, while other important products are cloves and rice.  Industry and services provide employment for 30.00% and 29.98% of the population, respectively. Additionally fishing employs 0.02% of the population.

Infrastructures
The National road 5a connects the town with Sambava (81 km) and Ambilobe in the North.
Antalaha has a maritime harbour. The local airport is situated at 12km west of Antalaha.

Education 
In addition to primary schooling the town offers secondary education at both junior and senior levels. The town has a permanent court and hospital.

Rivers
Ambinany river, Ankavanana and  Ankavia.

Sports
JSA Antalaha - football champion of SAVA in  2012, 2014 and 2019.

Climate
Antalaha experiences a humid trade-wind tropical rainforest climate (Koppen Af) with prodigious rainfall all year-round. The months from May to November are slightly drier, cooler, and less humid. Despite this, hot temperatures, high humidity, and high rainfall dominate year-round in Antalaha.

References

External links 
 Antalaha on MadaCamp

Cities in Madagascar
Populated places in Sava Region